Qingning is a town under the administration of Tongchuan District, Dazhou, Sichuan, China. , it administers Qingning Residential Community and the following six villages:
Huama Village
Qianli Village
Changti Village
Yanmen Village
Tianduan Village
Hongzhuan Village

References 

Township-level divisions of Sichuan
Dazhou